Ab Garmak or Abgarmak, also rendered as Ab Garmag, may refer to:

Bushehr Province
Abgarmak, Bushehr, a village in Jam County

Isfahan Province
Ab Garmak, Isfahan, a village in Semirom County

Khuzestan Province
Abgarmak, Andika, a village in Andika County
Ab Garmak, Bagh-e Malek, a village in Bagh-e Malek County
Ab Garmak-e Olya, a village in Shushtar County
Ab Garmak-e Sofla, Khuzestan, a village in Shushtar County

Kohgiluyeh and Boyer-Ahmad Province
 Ab Garmak-e Guznan, a village in Boyer-Ahmad County
 Ab Garmak-e Olya-ye Neqareh Khaneh, a village in Dana County

Lorestan Province
 Ab Garmag, Aligudarz, a village in Aligudarz County
 Abgarmak-e Olya, Besharat, a village in Besharat District, Aligudarz County
 Abgarmak-e Olya, Zaz va Mahru, a village in Zaz va Mahru District, Aligudarz County
 Abgarmak-e Sofla, Besharat, a village in Besharat District, Aligudarz County